This is a List of World Championships medalists in men's taekwondo.

Finweight
 −48 kg: 1975–1983
 −50 kg: 1985–1997
 −54 kg: 1999–

Flyweight
 −53 kg: 1975–1977
 −52 kg: 1979–1983
 −54 kg: 1985–1997
 −58 kg: 1999–

Bantamweight
 −58 kg: 1975–1977
 −56 kg: 1979–1983
 −58 kg: 1985–1997
 −62 kg: 1999–2007
 −63 kg: 2009–

Featherweight
 −63 kg: 1975–1977
 −60 kg: 1979–1983
 −64 kg: 1985–1997
 −67 kg: 1999–2007
 −68 kg: 2009–

Lightweight
 −64 kg: 1973
 −68 kg: 1975–1977
 −64 kg: 1979–1983
 −70 kg: 1985–1997
 −72 kg: 1999–2007
 −74 kg: 2009–

Welterweight
 −73 kg: 1975–1977
 −68 kg: 1979–1983
 −76 kg: 1985–1997
 −78 kg: 1999–2007
 −80 kg: 2009–

Light middleweight
 −73 kg: 1979–1983

Middleweight
 −80 kg: 1975–1977
 −78 kg: 1979–1983
 −83 kg: 1985–1997
 −84 kg: 1999–2007
 −87 kg: 2009–

Light heavyweight
 −84 kg: 1979–1983

Heavyweight
 +64 kg: 1973
 +80 kg: 1975–1977
 +84 kg: 1979–1983
 +83 kg: 1985–1997
 +84 kg: 1999–2007
 +87 kg: 2009–

Medal table

See also
List of Olympic medalists in taekwondo

References
WTF Medal Winners

Medalists
Taekwondo
World Championships men
World Championships men